Shoaib Mansoor (Full name, Shoaib Mansoor), (born 4 February 1951 Karachi) is a Pakistani television and film director, writer, producer, lyricist and musician of Muhajir origin. 

Active in the television industry since 1980, he first found success for composing and writing the song Dil Dil Pakistan in 1987, thereby introducing Vital Signs musical band in mainstream Pakistani television. He was also well-recognised for directing many critically acclaimed hit drama series on Pakistani television.

He became internationally known and popular for directing TV shows including the 1982 classic Ankahi, comedy series Fifty Fifty (1980) and the travel documentary show , Gulls and Guys which was sponsored  by the John Player Gold Leaf company  and which was a commercial success reality show, and the military fiction series, Alpha Bravo Charlie (1998). Mansoor found further critical acclaim for his musical abilities, writing songs for Vital Signs in the 1990s and introduced the band nationwide. A versatile artist, he became a popular and respected film director after the release of critically acclaimed films Khuda Kay Liye (2007) and Bol (2011). Mansoor won much acclaim for his work including the Sitara-i-Imtiaz Award from the President of Pakistan in 2008.

Career

Shoaib Mansoor or ShoMan (as he calls himself) is among the most influential and famous figures in the Karachi entertainment sector. He has directed, written and produced super hit TV shows such as Ankahi, Fifty Fifty, Alpha Bravo Charlie, Sunehrey Din and Gulls & Guys, which aired on Pakistan Television Corporation (PTV).

Shoaib Mansoor has also been a successful songwriter and music composer. Back in the 1980s, he introduced the pop sensation Vital Signs to the mainstream media. Besides being Junaid Jamshed's mentor, he was the backbone for the band's songs and composed and produced most of the Vital Signs' albums. Between 2001 and 2003, he directed the Ishq Mohabbat Apna Pan music video picturised on Iman Ali and Rasheed Naz. He wrote and composed a number of Vital Signs' hit numbers such as Aitebar. In addition, he directed all of Vital Signs' videos and also produced a music video compilation and a movie titled Geetar '93.

In 2007, Shoaib Mansoor debuted as a film director with the critically acclaimed film, Khuda Kay Liye released on 20 July 2007 all over Pakistan. It received the Silver Pyramid Award from the Cairo International Film Festival for 2007.

In 2009, he began directing a big budget film Bol, with Atif Aslam, Mahira Khan, Humaima Malick and Iman Ali playing lead roles. The premiere was on 24 June 2011.

Shoaib Mansoor's fourth film Verna starring Mahira Khan as the main female lead was released by Hum Films on 17 November 2017.

Filmography

Television
 Fifty Fifty (PTV sketch comedy) (1979-1984)
 Ankahi (PTV Drama series, 1982)
 Music '89 (PTV Pop Music Show, 1989)
 Sunehrey Din (PTV Drama Series)
 Leadings From The Front (Documentary on Imran Khan, 1993)
 Geetar '93 (The Vital Signs music video collection, 1993)
 Alpha Bravo Charlie (PTV Drama Series, 1997)
 Gulls & Guys (PTV Traveling Show, 1999)
 Dhundle Raste (PTV one episode drama)
 Jharnay (pop music show)
 Junoon Abhi Kum Nahin Huaa
 PTV Awards Ceremony 1986
 Lux Style Award Ceremony 2008
 Geetar93 (videos based on pop band Vital Signs, November 1993)

Awards and achievements
In recognition of his outstanding services, Mansoor has been decorated with presidential award of Pride of Performance in 2002 and Sitara-e-Imtiaz by the Government of Pakistan in 2008. He has also been awarded PTV Lifetime Achievement Award by the then-President of Pakistan Pervez Musharraf on the 43rd anniversary of Pakistan Television in November 2007. In 2007, he received the Silver Pyramid Award from the Cairo International Film Festival for Khuda Ke Liye. His film Bol (2011) was awarded the Best Hindi film award in IRDS Film awards 2011 by Institute for Research and Documentation in Social Sciences (IRDS), a Lucknow-based Civil society for raising many social issues including the regressive attitude of a male-dominated society. He has also won Lux Style Award, Roberto Rossellini Award, London Asian Film Festival and was nominated for Asia Pacific Screen Awards.

Lux Style Awards

References

External links

1951 births
Living people
Muhajir people
Pakistani television directors
Pakistani television writers
Pakistani songwriters
Pakistani composers
Pakistani television producers
Pakistani film producers
Pakistani music video directors
Pakistani film directors
Recipients of the Pride of Performance
Recipients of Sitara-i-Imtiaz
Writers from Karachi
Musicians from Karachi